The second season of Satyamev Jayate premiered on 2 March 2014. While Hindi is the show's primary language, it was dubbed and simulcast in Bengali, Malayalam, Marathi, Tamil and Telugu.

The second season was supposed to have three installments. The first installment, consisting of five episodes, was aired in March 2014. The second installment was ready in July 2014, and aired in September 2014.

Episodes

Episode 1: Fighting Rape
Episode 1 began with the 2012 Delhi Gang Rape Case. It highlighted facts and figures about rape incidents and focused on the problems that prevent survivors from getting justice. A survey that was conducted in Madhya Pradesh in 2013 that reported that 48% of the victims were wearing salwar kurta, 41% were clad in sari and 10% of toddlers wore frocks and pyjamas at the time of the incident.

Episode 2: Indian Police
Episode 2 highlights the issues faced by the police. It talks about the attempts made to introduce reform and protect police from political interference. This was ignored by state governments.

Episode 3: Don't Waste your Garbage
This episode highlighted the importance of waste management, negligence from the municipal corporations of Indian cities in managing trash efficiently. It showed simple, sustainable ways of recycling and reusing waste. Every year 1,60,000 megatons of waste is generated in India; about 1.5 tons of waste per head per month.

Episode 4: Kings Every Day
This episode highlights how politicians and government officials in a joint venture swallow public money raised from taxes. It mentions scams worth thousands of crores. It focuses on the fact that it is important to pay taxes and to be aware of what happens to the money.

Episode 5: Criminalization of Politics
This episode highlights how criminals enter into Indian political life. Aamir Khan focused on politicians' criminal records and showed how commoners display no apprehensions in demanding money for their votes. While a section of voters think their votes don't matter, another group of voters willingly sells their votes for TV sets, money and refrigerators.

Music
Sona Mohaptra came up with Bekhauff. Sona Mohaptra concluded the subject matter with Ram Sampath's composition. In the last episode Shankar Mahadevan sings about the importance of the vote.

See also
Satyamev Jayate (talk show)
Satyamev Jayate (season 1)
Satyamev Jayate (season 3)

References

External links
 Official site
 Official YouTube

2014 Indian television seasons
Satyamev Jayate (talk show)